Paul Edmund DuCharme (August 27, 1917 – October 12, 1985) was an American professional basketball player. He served in the United States Navy during World War II. He played in the National Basketball League for the Akron Firestone Non-Skids in three games during the 1940–41 season and averaged 0.3 points per game.

References

1917 births
1985 deaths
Akron Firestone Non-Skids players
American men's basketball players
United States Navy personnel of World War II
Basketball players from Illinois
Guards (basketball)
Notre Dame Fighting Irish men's basketball players
People from Kankakee County, Illinois
Military personnel from Illinois